River View Cemetery is a historic rural cemetery located in Center Township, Dearborn County, Indiana.  Designed by noted architect William Tinsley, the cemetery was established in 1869, and features curvilinear and contoured drive paths and radial burial arrangements.  Notable contributing resources include the Soldier's Circle; entry gate, fencing, and signage; the cemetery chapel (1906); Romanesque Revival style well house (1889); and three mausoleums: the Yorm Mausoleum (1886), Stevens Mausoleum (1907), and McHenry Mausoleum (1877).  Notable interments include Jesse Lynch Holman (1784–1842) (reburial from Veraestau), Lonnie Mack (1941–2016), and William Steele Holman (1822–1897).

It was added to the National Register of Historic Places in 2013.

References

External links
 

Cemeteries on the National Register of Historic Places in Indiana
Victorian architecture in Indiana
Romanesque Revival architecture in Indiana
1869 establishments in Indiana
Buildings and structures in Dearborn County, Indiana
National Register of Historic Places in Dearborn County, Indiana